Free Youth Movement (FYM) (Kurdish جوڵانەوەى گەنجانى ئازاد) is a youth group that began in the Winters of 2011 in Iraqi Kurdistan by a group of journalists and students to support freedom in the Middle East and the whole world.

Description 
Free Youth Movement started its activities early in February 2011. The first activity was at American University of Iraq-Sulaimani, FYM held a meeting to support the revolution of Egyptians and Tunisians at the 
time. 
FYM foundation and activities were covered by local media widely, at the first week of their activities, more than a dozen of websites and newspapers published news and report on them.

References

External links 
 http://www.kurdishaspect.com/doc020211YK.html

Organizations established in 2011
Iraqi Kurdistan
2011 establishments in Iraq